Metrobank may refer to:
 Metropolitan Bank and Trust Company (Metrobank), a Philippine bank founded in 1962
 MetroBank, the subsidiary of MetroCorp Bancshares, an American bank based in Houston, Texas
 Metro Bank (United Kingdom), a British retail bank established in 2010